was a Japanese physician, academic, medical researcher and neuropathologist.  He is credited with having first observed Hirano bodies which are intracellular aggregates of actin and actin-associated proteins in the neurons (nerve cells).

Career
Dr. Hirano was a professor of pathology at Albert Einstein College of Medicine.

Selected works
In a statistical overview derived from writings by and about Asao Hirano, OCLC/WorldCat encompasses roughly 30 works in 50+ publications in 5 languages and 1,000+ library holdings.

 Electron Microscopic Atlas of Brain Tumors (1971), with Tung Pui Poon
 Atlas of Neuropathology (1974), with by Nathan Malamud
 An Atlas of the Human Brain for Computerized Tomography (1978), with Takayoshi Matsui
 Color Atlas of Pathology of the Nervous System (1980)
 A Guide to Neuropathology (1981)
 Atlas d'anatomie pathologique du système nerveux (1981)
 Neuropsychiatric Disorders in the Elderly (1983)
 Praktischer Leitfaden der Neuropathologie (1983)
 The Pathology of the Myelinated Axon (1984), with 	Masazumi Adachi
 神経病理を学ぶ人のために (1986)
 神経病理を学ぶ人のために (2003)
 カラーアトラス神経病理 (2006)

Honors
 Order of the Rising Sun, 2001.

Notes

References
 Gajdusek, D. Carleton, Clarence J. Gibbs Jr. and Michael Alpers. (1965) Slow Latent and Temperate Virus Infections. Bethesda: National Institutes of Health, National Institute of Neurological Diseases and Blindness. OCLC 463013735

Japanese neurologists
American medical researchers
Recipients of the Order of the Rising Sun
1926 births
2019 deaths